I Love You, Goodbye may refer to:

 "I Love You, Goodbye" (song), a 1992 song by Céline Dion
 I Love You, Goodbye (film), a 2009 Filipino film